Cut in Half and Also Double is the debut album by Canadian artist Emily Haines that she self-released in about 2,000 copies in 1996 in Toronto. The song "Carpet" contains similar lyrics and vocal melodies to those in "Too Little Too Late," which she recorded a decade later with her band Metric. "Pink" finishes with a recording of a homeless woman rambling.

Copies of the album are extremely rare and often sell in excess of $100 online.

Though the musicians originally asked fans that had gained access to this album to avoid distributing copies via the internet, songs from this solo disc can be found online.

Track listing

 "Dog" – 2:26
 "Bore" – 2:29
 "Eden" – 3:32
 "Pretty Head" – 2:52
 "Freak" – 4:44
 "The View" – 2:48
 "Eau de Toilette" – 3:19
 "Carpet" – 2:48
 "Pink" – 5:00

Recording dates and locations for songs:
 Dog - Montreal, 1996
 Bore - Montreal, 1995
 Eden - Vancouver, 1992
 Pretty Head - Toronto, 1995
 Freak - Toronto, 1996
 The View - Vancouver, 1992
 Eau de Toilette - Vancouver, 1993
 Carpet - Toronto, 1995
 Pink - Toronto, 1995

References

Emily Haines albums
1996 albums